Philema is an unincorporated community in Lee County, in the U.S. state of Georgia.

History
A post office called Philema was established in 1892, and remained in operation until 1917. The community takes its name from nearby Philema Branch.

References

Unincorporated communities in Lee County, Georgia
Unincorporated communities in Georgia (U.S. state)